Joel Hart was a physician; the only son of Ephraim Hart; born in Philadelphia in 1784; died in New York City June 14, 1842. He received the degree of M.D. from the Royal College of Physicians and Surgeons, London. He was one of the charter members of the Medical Society of the County of New York. He married, May 2, 1810, in London, to Louisa Levien, and had issue. On Feb. 7, 1817, he was appointed by President James Madison United States consul at Leith, Scotland, and remained there in that capacity until 1832, when he returned to New York and resumed the practice of medicine.

References 
 

1784 births
1842 deaths
19th-century American diplomats
18th-century American physicians
19th-century American people
Physicians from Philadelphia
American expatriates in the United Kingdom